The Ministry of Youth and Sports (Arabic: وزارة الإعلام) is a cabinet ministry of Yemen.

List of ministers 

 Nayef al-Bakri (14 September 2015 – present)
 Rafat al-Akhali (9 November 2014 – September 2015)

References 

Government ministries of Yemen